Vivek Vihar metro station is a metro station on the Pink Line of the Jaipur Metro. It was opened on 3 June 2015. It serves Vivek Vihar is a colony in the city of Jaipur.

History

Station layout

Connections

Entry and exits

See also

References

External links
 UrbanRail.Net — descriptions of all metro systems in the world, each with a schematic map showing all stations.

2015 establishments in Rajasthan
Jaipur Metro stations
Railway stations in India opened in 2015